Wola Pobiedzińska  is a village in the administrative district of Gmina Nowe Miasto nad Pilicą, within Grójec County, Masovian Voivodeship, in east-central Poland.

The village has a population of 150.

References

Villages in Grójec County